FilmFlex, is an on-demand movie rental services provider, claiming to be largest outside the US.

The service originally launched as a joint venture between Sony Pictures Television and The Walt Disney Company, but it was sold in 2014 to Vubiquity.

Virgin Movies 
Virgin Movies makes up part of Virgin Media's "On Demand" video on demand system. Virgin Movies has been available on Virgin since January 2005 and saw over 11 million films watched on demand in 2009. FilmFlex replaced Front Row which was a near video on demand pay-per-view service which was initially available on analogue cable from 1997, switching to digital when digital cable services launched from late 1999 onwards. On 13 September 2012, the FilmFlex service was rebranded as Virgin Movies on the cable platform.

Virgin Movies provides over 500 movies some of which are available in HD (high definition), which are available at any time for the viewer to watch when they want to. Viewers can search for a movie by title, genre, cast or director. Once a movie has been ordered it can be viewed any time within the next 24 hours before it has to be paid for again. The movie can also be viewed as many times as the viewer likes within the 24 hours for no additional cost. Once viewers are watching a movie they have full control over it by the use of pause, rewind and fast forward functions, much like a DVD.

All genres of movies are available ranging from Hollywood blockbusters to action, adventure, horror, comedy, romance and classic movies.

On 8 February 2013, the two companies signed a multi-year deal, with investment in the development of next-gen functionality on Virgin Movies, including "multi-device playback" through Virgin TV Anywhere.

Virgin Media Online Movies 
On 26 April 2010, Virgin Media announced the launch of its first online movies service: Virgin Media Online Movies. All rentals will offer unlimited streamed views for 48 hours so viewers can pause, rewind and watch again, plus the film can be watched wherever the account holder logs on. Virgin Media Online Movies is powered by FilmFlex, the service is delivered over the web using Microsoft Silverlight and will initially present movies in standard definition. A HD version of the service was tested, although  has not been made available.

Penny Movies Festival 
From 30 March 2007 Virgin Media ran a movies promotion called the 'Penny Movies Festival'. The promotion was run over five weeks and each week focused on a different genre. Week one: blockbusters, week two: family favourites, week three: cult classics, week four: comedy, week five: action adventure.

Each week viewers could vote on the Virgin Media website for their favourite movie out of a selection of 15 movies and the winning movie would be available to view on the On Demand service, during the next week for the price of 1p.

The festival returned in 2008.

Film4oD 

Channel 4 partnered with FilmFlex to launch an online video on-demand service for Film4. Film4oD, which officially launched on 1 November 2010, has more than 500 films available for 48-hour rental online.

HMVon-demand 
In November 2011, HMV Group partnered with FilmFlex to launch the online video on-demand service HMVon-demand. The online service offers content available on a rental basis for consumers to stream or download to view offline, with other models planned including download-to-own and cloud-based locker services. FilmFlex manage all digital rights and security on behalf of HMV and are responsible for the website build and platform operation; content management; billing and customer service as well as on-site promotion. HMV initially promoted the service with a soft launch through its hmv.com store, with the main launch activity beginning in January 2012.

EE film 
On 30 October 2011, FilmFlex launched the EE Film store together with EE, to coincide with the launch of its 4G service. The service is a combined cinema ticketing, listings, trailers and film download platform, which is also available via computers and features pause and play functionality, allowing viewers to start watching on one device and finish on another.

References

External links 

Filmflex Ratings Currently available movies listed by ratings according to Rotten Tomatoes, Metacritic etc.

Television in the United Kingdom
Virgin Media
Video on demand services